Arthur E. Stadler (born April 17, 1892 in Marenisco Township, Michigan), was a member of the Wisconsin State Assembly. He later resided in Owen, Wisconsin.

Career
Stadler was elected to the Assembly in 1946 and re-elected in 1948. Additionally, he was a member of the School Board and Chairman of the Town Board of Owen, as well as Chairman and Supervisor of the Clark County, Wisconsin Board. He was a Republican.

References

People from Gogebic County, Michigan
People from Clark County, Wisconsin
County supervisors in Wisconsin
Republican Party members of the Wisconsin State Assembly
School board members in Wisconsin
1892 births
Year of death missing